Franz Lemnitz (11 July 1890 – 2 November 1963) was a German road racing cyclist who competed in the 1912 Summer Olympics. He was born in Tollwitz. In 1912 he was a member of the German cycling team which finished sixth in the team time trial event. In the individual time trial competition he finished 26th.

References

1890 births
1963 deaths
German male cyclists
Olympic cyclists of Germany
Cyclists at the 1912 Summer Olympics
People from Saalekreis
Cyclists from Saxony-Anhalt